Kalyana Ramudu is a 2003 Telugu family film and remake of 2002 Malayalam film Kalyanaraman, directed by G. Ram Prasad and produced by Venkata Shyam Prasad under SP Entertainments. The film stars Venu Thottempudi, Prabhu Deva and Nikita in the lead roles.

Cast

Venu Thottempudi as Kalyana Ramudu "Ramu"
Prabhu Deva as Rajesh
Nikita as Kalyani
Suman as Shiva
Nassar as Kalyani's father
Sunil as Chari
M. S. Narayana as Pahilwan
Chittajalu Lakshmipati
Raja Ravindra as Madan
Raghu Babu as Subbu
Gundu Prasad
J. V. Somayajulu
Allu Ramalingaiah as Kalyana Ramudu's grandfather
 Vajja Venkata Giridhar as Student
Devi Charan
Sana as Kalyani's mother

Music

The music of the film was composed by Mani Sharma. Except "Preminchukuna", all the tunes from Malayalam original were retained in this version.

References

External links
 

2000s Telugu-language films
Telugu remakes of Malayalam films
Films scored by Mani Sharma